Lobesia euphorbiana is a species of moth, belonging to the family Tortricidae.

It is native to Europe.

References

Olethreutini